Polposipus herculeanus, the Frégate Island giant tenebrionid beetle or Frégate beetle, is a flightless species of beetle in family Tenebrionidae. It is endemic to Frégate Island in the Seychelles. It grows to be about 20–30 mm long and has a hard, rounded abdomen covered with tubercles. There appears to be no sexual dimorphism. They are largely arboreal, sheltering under the bark of trees, beneath the crooks of branches, and within bushes during the day. They are believed to be nocturnal, descending to the forest floor at night, though never travelling far. This behaviour may help them to avoid predators such as the Wright's Skink and the Seychelles magpie-robin. When in danger, chemicals will secrete from the defensive glands in the posterior of the beetle, which have a musky smell and stains the skin purple.  In captivity they have been noted to eat a variety of fruits, vegetables, bark, fungus and cat food. There are a few captive populations, taken for conservation reasons, the largest being at London zoo. These populations are the descendants of two small populations taken from the wild several years apart. It is quite possible that it previously lived on other islands in the Seychelles, and it has been suggested that it could be reintroduced to other islands to reduce its vulnerability. In captivity they have been recorded to live for up to seven years.

References

Sources
ARKive Images 
Nature Seychelles 2005. Giant Tenebrionid Beetle.  Downloaded on 10 October 2009.

Amanda Ferguson & Paul Pearce-Kelly (2004). Management guidelines for the welfare of zoo animals: The Frégate Island giant tenebrionid beetle Polposipus herculeanus

Fauna of Seychelles
Tenebrionidae
Endemic fauna of Seychelles
Taxonomy articles created by Polbot
Beetles described in 1848